CKHA-FM is a Canadian radio station, which airs at 100.9 FM in Haliburton, Ontario. The station operates a community radio format branded as Canoe FM.

History
On February 10, 2003, the Haliburton County Community Radio Association received Canadian Radio-television and Telecommunications Commission (CRTC) approval to operate a new English-language FM community radio station at 100.9 MHz in Haliburton, Ontario, which signed on in July 2003. The station is operated by volunteers as a not-for-profit station, with programming designed for full-time, part-time and seasonal residents of Haliburton County.

References

External links
 100.9 Canoe FM
 
 

Kha
Kha
Radio stations established in 2003
2003 establishments in Ontario